Darko Glishikj (born 23 September 1991) is a Macedonian footballer who currently plays as a left back for Vardar.

International career
After finishing his first season in Georgia with double (winning both Championship and Cup) Glishikj was called up for the senior team for the first time. He made his debut in a June 2013 friendly match away against Sweden and has earned a total of 2 caps, scoring no goals. His second and final international was another June 2013 friendly against Norway.

Honours

Club
Dinamo Tbilisi
Georgian Premier League: 2012–13, 2013–14
Georgian Cup: 2012–13, 2013–14

Vardar
Macedonian First League: 2014–15, 2015–16, 2016–17

References

External links
 

Macedonian Football 

1991 births
Living people
Footballers from Skopje
Macedonian people of Serbian descent
Association football fullbacks
Macedonian footballers
North Macedonia youth international footballers
North Macedonia under-21 international footballers
North Macedonia international footballers
FK Vardar players
FK Olimpik players
FK Skopje players
FK Napredok players
FK Teteks players
FC Dinamo Tbilisi players
FC Septemvri Sofia players
FC Arda Kardzhali players
FK Shkupi players
Macedonian First Football League players
Premier League of Bosnia and Herzegovina players
Erovnuli Liga players
First Professional Football League (Bulgaria) players
Macedonian expatriate footballers
Expatriate footballers in Bosnia and Herzegovina
Macedonian expatriate sportspeople in Bosnia and Herzegovina
Expatriate footballers in Georgia (country)
Macedonian expatriate sportspeople in Georgia (country)
Expatriate footballers in Bulgaria
Macedonian expatriate sportspeople in Bulgaria